Los Nopalitos is a census-designated place (CDP) in Webb County, Texas, United States. This was a new CDP for the 2010 census with a population of 62.

Geography
Los Nopalitos is located at  (27.619521, -99.205609).

Education
Residents are in the United Independent School District. Zoned schools include: Dr. Henry Cuellar Elementary School, Antonio Gonzalez Middle School, and United South High School.

The designated community college for Webb County is Laredo Community College.

References

Census-designated places in Webb County, Texas
Census-designated places in Texas